The 1968–69 Cypriot Cup was the 27th edition of the Cypriot Cup. A total of 16 clubs entered the competition. It began with the first round and concluded on 29 June 1969 with the final which was held at GSP Stadium (1902). APOEL won their 6th Cypriot Cup trophy after beating Omonoia 1–0 in the final.

Sources

See also
 Cypriot Cup
 1968–69 Cypriot First Division

Cypriot Cup seasons
1968–69 domestic association football cups
1968–69 in Cypriot football